Herbert Alington (13 December 1842 – 13 January 1938) was an English cricketer. He played in two first-class matches in New Zealand for Canterbury from 1868 to 1870.

See also
 List of Canterbury representative cricketers

References

External links
 

1842 births
1938 deaths
English cricketers
Canterbury cricketers
People from Spilsby